Homapoderus tamsi is a species of weevils of the family Attelabidae. It occurs in Equatorial Guinea, the Democratic Republic of the Congo and the island of Príncipe in São Tomé and Príncipe. The species was described as Parapoderus tamsi in 1937. It was placed into the genus Homapoderus by Legalov in the mid-2000s.

References

Attelabidae
Beetles described in 1937
Fauna of Príncipe
Insects of São Tomé and Príncipe
Insects of Equatorial Guinea
Insects of the Democratic Republic of the Congo